The State Road 948 designation was originally used for what is now State Road 924.

Locally known as Northwest 36th Street and Doral Boulevard, the  State Road 948 (SR 948) is a commercially important east–west highway in central Miami-Dade County, Florida.  Its western terminus is a cloverleaf interchange with the Palmetto Expressway (SR 826) in Doral; its eastern terminus is an intersection with US 27 just east of LeJeune Road (SR 953) in the southern tip of Hialeah, just outside the city limits of Miami.  Some maps incorrectly indicate a continuation of SR 948 to the east of the intersection with US 27.   State Road 948 serves as a primary access for the cities of Miami Springs and Virginia Gardens and a maintenance and business access for Miami International Airport.

Route description
To the west of the SR 948 western terminus extends Doral Boulevard, which changes from Northwest 36th Street to Northwest 41st Street as it travels along the southern boundary of Doral Country Club and Golf Course and crosses the city of Doral.  The western terminus of Doral Boulevard/North 41st Street is a dead-end just to the west of West 147th Avenue, three miles (5 km) to the west of its interchange with Florida's Turnpike (SR 821).  East of the Turnpike, Doral Boulevard is dominated by shopping centers as much is SR 948; to the west, Northwest 41st Street is primary an access road for limestone quarries and the wells that supply Miami-Dade County its drinking water.

History
As the Dolphin Expressway (SR 836) has become increasingly congested with commuter traffic, SR 948—a much older road—has become (with LeJeune Road) a primary access route to the passenger terminals of the airport, and, as a result, is reaching its carrying capacity on a regular basis.  Since the opening of the Dolphin Expressway in 1969, several proposals for creating an SR 948 expressway have been floated to the Florida Department of Transportation and the Miami-Dade County Commission only to be rejected each time.

The current configuration of SR 948 received its number in the mid 1980s, after the designation was removed from a section of North 119th Street in North Miami (now part of SR 924) as a part of a collection of renumberings of Miami-Dade State Roads.  Prior to the redesignation, North 36th Street between the Palmetto Expressway and US 27 was State Road 834 (the SR 834 designation was subsequently applied to Sample Road in Broward County).

Major intersections

References

948
948
Doral, Florida
Hialeah, Florida